Kankan is a prefecture located in the Kankan Region of Guinea. The capital is Kankan. The prefecture covers an area of 19,750 km.² and has a population of 2,450,890.

Sub-prefectures
The prefecture is divided administratively into 13 sub-prefectures:
 Kankan-Centre
 Balandougou
 Bate-Nafadji
 Boula
 Gbérédou-Baranama
 Kanfamoriyah
 Koumban
 Mamouroudou
 Missamana
 Moribayah
 Sabadou-Baranama
 Tinti-Oulen
 Tokounou 

Prefectures of Guinea
Kankan Region